My Life as a Book is a children's novel written by Janet Tashjian and illustrated by her teenage son, Jake Tashjian. It is the first book in the My Life series. It has been translated into ten languages including Spanish, Catalan, Hebrew, Turkish, Czech, and German. Its sequels-My Life as a Stuntboy and My Life as a Cartoonist - have also been translated into several languages.

The novel tells the story of Derek Fallon, a mischievous twelve-year-old boy who finds reading difficult because of his reading disability. As a way to learn his vocabulary words, he illustrates them in the margins of a book his mom got him.  When he discovers a newspaper in the attic with the story of a girl who drowned on Martha's Vineyard, he spends his summer trying to uncover the mystery of what happened instead of completing his summer reading list.

Background 
Tashjian wanted to write a book for reluctant readers with the humor and visual support of a Calvin and Hobbes book, even dedicating the novel to its creator Bill Watterson. She incorporated the methods of several reading programs into the novels such as Lindamood Bell's ‘Visualizing and Verbalizing’ and Maryanne Wolf’s ‘Rave-O.’

Books in the Series 
The series has a total of 10 books. The sequel to the 10th book of the series, My Life as a TikTok Star released on January 1, 2022.

 My Life as a Book (2010)
 My Life as a Stuntboy (2011)
 My Life as a Cartoonist (2013)
 My Life as a Joke (2014)
 My Life as a Gamer (2015)
 My Life as a Ninja (2017)
 My Life as a Youtuber (2018)
 My Life as a Meme (2019)
 My Life as a Coder (2020)
 My Life as a Billionaire (2021)
 My Life as a Tik Tok Star'' (2022)

References 

http://www.booklistonline.com/ProductInfo.aspx?pid=3999399&AspxAutoDetectCookieSupport=1
http://us.macmillan.com/mylifeasabook/JanetTashjian
http://www.kidsreads.com/reviews/my-life-as-a-book

Novels by Janet Tashjian
2010 American novels
American children's novels
2010 children's books
Henry Holt and Company books